Bittering may refer to:
Bittering agent
Bittering, Norfolk